The 2019 Indoor Football League season was the eleventh of the Indoor Football League (IFL). The league played this season with ten teams, up from six the previous season, by adding two expansion teams and two teams from Champions Indoor Football.

The top six teams made the IFL playoffs, with the first round consisting of the top two seeds earning byes, the third seed hosting the sixth seed, and the fourth hosting the fifth seed. In the semifinals, the top seed hosted the lower remaining seed and the second hosting the higher-seeded winner from the first round. The semifinal winners met in the 2019 United Bowl on the weekend of July 13.

Offseason 
In August 2018, the IFL announced the first 2019 expansion team, the Tucson Sugar Skulls, owned by Arizona Rattlers' head coach Kevin Guy. On September 7, the IFL announced the Quad City Steamwheelers had joined the league from Champions Indoor Football (CIF). On October 5, the Bismarck Bucks of the CIF also announced their move to the IFL.

During the previous season, the Cedar Rapids Titans were sold to Roy Choi and the team was rebranded as Cedar Rapids River Kings for the 2019 season. In November 2018, Choi also launched a second 2019 IFL expansion team called the San Diego Strike Force.

Teams

Standings

Playoffs

References

External links